The Norfolk Ridge is a long submarine ridge running between New Caledonia and New Zealand, about 1300 km off the east-coast of Australia.

It is part of a complex region of ridges between the crust of the Pacific Basin and the continental crust of Australia. Little is known about the Norfolk Ridge; however, it generally lies about 2000 m below sea level and consists of Late Cretaceous continental crust. It is part of Zealandia, a submerged continent that sank 60-85 million years ago.

References

Zealandia
Underwater ridges of the Pacific Ocean
Geography of the New Zealand seabed
Geology of Zealandia